Mykyta Valeriyovych Burda (born 24 March 1995) is a Ukrainian professional footballer who plays as a centre-back for Dynamo Kyiv in the Ukrainian Premier League.

Club career
Born in Yenakiyeve, a city village in Donetsk Oblast, Mykyta began playing football in Yahotyn, Kyiv Oblast, where he attended local sports school. When he was sixteen, Burda transferred to Dynamo Kyiv football academy, where he began playing for Dynamo Kyiv youth and reserve squads.

On 23 August 2014, Burda made his senior team debut in the 3-1 Ukrainian Cup victory over Zirka Kirovohrad at Zirka Stadium, playing all 90 minutes.

It wasn't until the 2018–19 season, however, that Burda firmly established himself as a first-team regular, playing in a total of 43 matches for Dynamo across all competitions.

International career
Burda was part of the Ukraine under-20 squad that participated in the 2015 FIFA U-20 World Cup, reaching the second round. He played in all four of his team's matches at the tournament.

On 31 May 2018, Burda made his Ukraine national team debut, playing 90 minutes in a 0-0 friendly draw against Morocco at Stade de Genève.

Career statistics

Club

International

Honours

Dynamo Kyiv
 Ukrainian Premier League: 2014–15, 2015–16
 Ukrainian Cup: 2014–15

References

External links
Club profile
FPL profile
 
 

1995 births
Living people
People from Yenakiieve
Piddubny Olympic College alumni
Ukrainian footballers
Association football defenders
Ukraine youth international footballers
Ukraine under-21 international footballers
Ukraine international footballers
FC Dynamo Kyiv players
Ukrainian Premier League players
Sportspeople from Donetsk Oblast